Imtechella is a Gram-negative, rod-shaped, non-spore-forming and non-motile genus of bacteria from the family of Flavobacteriaceae with one known species (Imtechella halotolerans).

References

Flavobacteria
Bacteria genera
Monotypic bacteria genera
Taxa described in 2015